Šćedro is an island in the Adriatic Sea with an area of 8.36 km2,  off the south coast of the island of Hvar, Croatia, opposite the settlement of Zavala. The name comes from štedri, meaning charitable in old Slavonic, because the island offers two deep, well-protected coves. The Latin name of Šćedro was Tauris from which derived the Italian Tauricola or Torcola.

According to the Hvar Statute of 1331, the island was communal property and reserved for use as a pasture. The island is very fertile, and has a milder climate than Hvar and, thanks to night dew, was even used to grow grain.

A Dominican monastery was founded in the Bay of Mostir (1465), together with a hospice for sailors, and abandoned in the 18th century.  There is an old quarry at Stare Stine, and gypsum from the island was used in the Baroque chapels of Hvar cathedral.

Around 30 people live on the island in summer. The old settlements of Mostir and Nastane are now largely abandoned, except for restaurants and other tourist facilities in the summer season.

References 

Uninhabited islands of Croatia
Islands of the Adriatic Sea
Landforms of Split-Dalmatia County